Mocanu is a Romanian surname. Notable people with the surname include:

 Ana Mocanu (born 1937), Romanian volleyball player
 Diana Mocanu (born 1984), Romanian swimmer
 George Mocanu (born 1982), Moldovan politician
 Ion Mocanu, (born 1962), Romanian handball player
 Mihai Mocanu (1942–2009), Romanian footballer
 Petru Mocanu (1931–2016), Romanian mathematician
 Sergiu Mocanu (born 1961), Moldovan politician

See also
 
 Mocan (surname)

Romanian-language surnames